The 2019 LCK season was the eighth season of the League of Legends Champions Korea (LCK), a professional esports league for the MOBA PC game League of Legends.

Spring Split

Team standings

Playoffs

Summer Split

Team standings

Playoffs

Media

Streams

Broadcast Talent 
Korean
 Jeon "Caster Jun" Yong Jun – Play-by-Play Caster
 Seung "SEONG K" Seung Heon – Play-by-Play Caster
 Lee "CloudTemplar" Hyun-woo – Color Caster
 Kim Dong-jun – Color Caster
 Kang "KangQui" Seung Hyun – Color Caster
 English
 Max "Atlus" Anderson – Play-by-Play Caster
 Chris "PapaSmithy" Smith – Color Caster
 Brendan "Valdes" Valdes – Play-by-Play Caster
 Nick "LS" De Cesare – Color Caster

Viewership Statistics

Spring

Summer

References 

League of Legends Champions Korea seasons
2019 multiplayer online battle arena tournaments